"Love of a Lifetime"  is a 1986 single by Chaka Khan.  The single was the first release from Chaka Khan's Destiny album. "Love of a Lifetime" was written by David Gamson and Green Gartside. Gartside performed backing vocals and also co-produced the single along with Arif Mardin. In the UK, "Love of a Lifetime" peaked at No. 52. In the US, the single reached No. 53 on the Hot 100 and No. 21 on the soul singles chart.  "Love of A Lifetime" had its best showing on the US dance chart, where it peaked at #11. The music video was filmed on location at Long Island's Adventureland amusement park.

References

Chaka Khan songs
1986 songs
1986 singles
Songs written by David Gamson
Songs written by Green Gartside